The Cabinet of Tanzania is the most senior level of the executive branch of Tanzania and consists of President, Vice President, Prime Minister, President of Zanzibar and all the Ministers. For the composition of the current Cabinet see Cabinet of Tanzania

2015 - 2021 Cabinet

The Cabinet of Tanzania in 2015.

See also
Politics of Tanzania

References

External links
Tanzania Affairs

Government of Tanzania
Cabinet of Tanzania